Shirō Asano may refer to:

 Shirō Asano (politician) (born 1948), Japanese university professor and former politician
 Shirō Asano (cameraman), cameraman in the early years of Cinema of Japan

See also
 Shirō Sano (born 1955), a Japanese actor